Hermann von Bönninghausen (24 July 1888 – 26 January 1919) was a German athlete who competed at the 1908 Summer Olympics and in the 1912 Summer Olympics. He died after World War I due to injury by being shot in the face.

Biography
Von Bönninghausen was born in Bocholt. In the 100 metres event at the 1908 Summer Games, he took fifth place in his first round heat with a time of 12.0 seconds. He did not advance to the semifinals. He also participated in the long jump competition but his final ranking is unknown.

Four years later he was eliminated in the semi-finals of the 110-metre hurdles event.

See also
 List of Olympians killed in World War I

References

External links
 
 
 

1888 births
1919 deaths
People from Bocholt, Germany
Sportspeople from Münster (region)
German male sprinters
German male hurdlers
German male long jumpers
Olympic athletes of Germany
1. FC Bocholt players
Athletes (track and field) at the 1908 Summer Olympics
Athletes (track and field) at the 1912 Summer Olympics
German military personnel killed in World War I
German footballers needing infoboxes
Association footballers not categorized by position
Footballers from North Rhine-Westphalia
German footballers
German military doctors
Military personnel from North Rhine-Westphalia
German Army personnel of World War I